UM Timișoara was a Romanian professional football club from Timișoara, Romania, founded in 1960 and dissolved in 2008.

History
The football team of Uzinele Mecanice Timișoara was founded in 1960, playing in the first years of its existence in the Ronaț neighborhood on the field that would later become the Stadionul Gheorghe Rășcanu. 

The club managed to promoted in Divizia C at the end of the 1966–67 season, when it won the Banat Regional Championship and the play-off for promotion against Aurul Brad, the winner of the Hunedoara Regional Championship. In the 1970s, the team went to play on the Stadionul UMT, known at that time as Stadionul Electrica.

The club did not obtain great performances during its existence, but succeeded to play one season of Romanian top football, in the 2001–02 Divizia A.

At the end of the 2007–08 Liga III, UMT were relegated to the Timiș County League (Liga IV), but didn't start in this competition because they were dissolved.

Honours
Liga II:
Winners (1): 2000–01

Liga III:
Winners (4): 1969–70, 1990–91, 1996–97, 1998–99
Runners-up (3): 1972–73, 1983–84, 2005–06

Banat Regional Championship:
Winners (1): 1966–67

Notable former managers

 Gheorghe Chimiuc
 Cristian Contescu
 Ciprian Aioanei
 Aurel Șunda

 Costică Rădulescu
 Orlando Trandu
 Ion Dumitru

 Costică Toma
 Gheorghe Staicu
 Remus Steop

References

 
Football clubs in Timiș County
Sport in Timișoara
Association football clubs established in 1960
Association football clubs disestablished in 2008
Defunct football clubs in Romania
Liga I clubs
Liga II clubs
1960 establishments in Romania
2008 disestablishments in Romania